Decatur Township is in Macon County, Illinois. At the 2010 census, its population was 52,915 and it contained 24,918 housing units.

Cities and towns 
 Bearsdale
 Decatur (main part)
 Wyckles Corners

Adjacent townships 
 Hickory Point Township (north)
 Whitmore Township (north and northeast)
 Oakley Township (east)
 Long Creek Township (southeast)
 South Wheatland Township (south)
 Blue Mound Township (southwest)
 Harristown Township (west)
 Illini Township (northwest)

Geography

Demographics

References

External links
City-data.com
Illinois State Archives

Townships in Macon County, Illinois
1859 establishments in Illinois
Populated places established in 1859
Townships in Illinois